This list of fossil fish species is a list of taxa of fish that have been described during the year 2012. The list only includes taxa at the level of genus or species.

Newly named jawless vertebrates

Newly named acanthodians

Newly named cartilaginous fishes

Newly named bony fishes

References 

2010s in paleontology
Paleontology
2012 in paleontology